The Rock carvings at Møllerstufossen in Nord-Sinni in Nordre Land municipality in Oppland county of Norway comprise several carvings of moose and one other animal. The site covers about 20 m². The largest figure measures about 90 cm across. The figures are carved with deep and wide strokes and are easy to spot.

How to get there
The carvings have been repainted and the site is signposted near the road between Dokka in Nordre Land and Aurdal in Nord-Aurdal. The river Etna runs approximately 10 meters away, and in spring nearly floods the site.

There is also a small wooden bridge near the site to provide access and to limit wear on the carvings.

Gallery

See also
Pre-historic art
Petroglyph
History of Norway
List of World Heritage Sites in Europe
Rock carvings in Norway

External links
 Rock art at Directorate for Cultural Heritage — in Norwegian (there are also english pages)

Mollerstufossen
Nordre Land
Culture in Oppland